The Luis Muñoz Rivera Park (or Parque Luis Muñoz Rivera in Spanish) is a 27.2 acre (110,000 m2) recreational public space located in Puerta de Tierra in San Juan, Puerto Rico. The park was named in honor of Puerto Rican statesman Luis Muñoz Rivera. It is the largest public square in the San Juan metropolitan area.

History

In 1917 Law 43 was passed stating a park named Muñoz Rivera Park should be built in San Juan and land was set aside for its creation. The land once formed part of the city's "Third line of defense" built in the 18th century. The powder magazine built in 1769, “El Polvorín de San Gerónimo”, designed by military engineer Thomas O'Daly, is still located on the grounds of the park.

The east side of the park is bordered by the Puerto Rican Supreme Court building designed in 1952-56 by architects Toro Ferrer. To the north lies the public beach called El Escambrón Beach, the Parque del Tercer Milenio and the Sixto Escobar Stadium, former home of the San Juan Senators and Santurce Crabbers baseball clubs.

The park was designed by Bennett, Parsons & Frost of Chicago in 1925. Its construction from 1926 to 1934 was directed by William Parsons and Francisco Valines Cofresí. The distinctive faux bois park elements and furniture were designed by sculptor Victor M. Cott in the 1930s. Subsequent major restorations have been directed by architects Orval Sifontes in the 1970s, Otto Reyes Casanova in 1990–93, and by Andres Mignucci, in 2000–04, who also wrote about the park's history in his book .

In 2015, then mayor of San Juan Carmen Yulín Cruz announced the park would be used for educational purposes. In late December 2018, the park was the venue for a large fashion show raising awareness for the HIV pandemic.

Gallery

See also

 Plaza Las Delicias

References

External links
 Tour of the park

Parks in Puerto Rico
Geography of San Juan, Puerto Rico
National Register of Historic Places in San Juan, Puerto Rico
Protected areas established in 1925
Tourist attractions in San Juan, Puerto Rico
Parks on the National Register of Historic Places
National Register of Historic Places in Puerto Rico
1925 establishments in Puerto Rico